The Central District of Golshan County is a district (bakhsh) in Golshan County, Sistan and Baluchestan Province, Iran. At the 2006 census, its population was 23,211, in 4,441 families. The district has one city: Jaleq. The district has three rural districts (dehestan): Jaleq Rural District, Kalah Gan Rural District and Nahuk Rural District.

References 

Saravan County
Districts of Sistan and Baluchestan Province